The OFC U-20 Championship 1997 was held in Tahiti. It also served as qualification for the 1997 FIFA World Youth Championship.

Teams
The following teams entered the tournament:

 
 
 
  (host)

Group stage

Third place match

Final

Qualification to World Youth Championship
The tournament winner qualified for the 1997 FIFA World Youth Championship.

External links
Results by RSSSF

OFC U-20 Championship
Under 20
1997
Beach
1997 in youth association football